Qaleh Khaleseh (also Romanized as Qal‘eh Khāleşeh; also known as Qal‘eh) is a village in Qareh Naz Rural District, in the Central District of Maragheh County, East Azerbaijan Province, Iran. At the 2006 census, its population was 623, in 161 families.

References 

Towns and villages in Maragheh County